Karl von Oven (29 November 1888 – 20 January 1974) was a German general during World War II who commanded several corps. He was a recipient of the Knight's Cross of the Iron Cross of Nazi Germany.

Awards and decorations

 Knight's Cross of the Iron Cross on 9 January 1942 as Generalleutnant and commander of 56. Infanterie-Division

References

Citations

Bibliography

1888 births
1974 deaths
German Army generals of World War II
Generals of Infantry (Wehrmacht)
German Army personnel of World War I
German police officers
People from Charlottenburg
People from the Province of Brandenburg
Prussian Army personnel
Recipients of the clasp to the Iron Cross, 1st class
Recipients of the Knight's Cross of the Iron Cross
Military personnel from Berlin